Eugenio Soto can refer to:

 Eugenio Soto (basketball)
 Eugenio Soto (footballer)